Natthakritta Vongtaveelap (born 8 November 2002) is a Thai professional golfer playing on the LPGA Tour.

Early life and amateur career
Born in 2002, Vongtaveelap began playing golf at a very young age. As an amateur, she had a very successful career and got the titles at several events, including the 2021 and 2022 Singha Thailand Amateur Open, 2021 Singha Thailand Amateur Match Play Championship, and 2022 Singha Thailand Amateur Match Play Championship. She also ended up as a runner-up twice in the 2021 and 2022 Women's Amateur Asia-Pacific Championship.

In May 2022, she represented Thailand at the 2021 Southeast Asian Games and won two gold medals.

Professional career
Vongtaveelap turned professional in November 2022. In December 2022, she finished tied for 28th at the LPGA Q-Series to earn her LPGA Tour membership for the 2023 season.

2023
Vongtaveelap won her first event as a pro on the Thai LPGA Tour at the BGC Championship in February 2023. Two weeks later, she triumphed for her second consecutive Thai LPGA title at the NSDF Ladies Classic.

In late February, she made her LPGA debut at the Honda LPGA Thailand after winning the qualifying tournament in January and got the sponsor invitation. she took a four-shot lead at 20-under-par after 72 holes and attempted to be the first LPGA member to win on her first LPGA start but lost to Lilia Vu by one stroke in the final round.

Amateur wins 
2018 TGA-Singha Junior Golf Champion, TGA-Singha Junior Ranking #2, FCG Callaway World Championship, TGA-Singha Junior Ranking #4, TGA-Singha Junior Golf Championship
2019 National Team Ranking #3, TGA-Singha Junior Ranking #3, TGA-Singha Junior Ranking #5
2020 National Team Ranking #1, Thailand Junior Development Tour Master Championship, TGA-Singha Junior Ranking #2, TGA-Singha Junior Ranking #3, TGA-Singha Junior Ranking #4, TGA-Singha Junior Ranking #5
2021 National Team Ranking #1, National Team Ranking #2, National Team Ranking #3, TGA-Singha Junior Ranking #6, National Team Ranking #4, National Team Ranking #5, National Team Ranking #6, Winner Amateur Championship, National Team Ranking #7, Singha Thailand Amateur Match Play Championship, Singha Thailand Amateur Open, Singha Thailand Ladies Amateur Open
2022 National Team Ranking #1, National Team Ranking #2, Singha Thailand Amateur Match Play Championship, Southeast Asian Games (women's individual), Singha Thailand Amateur Open

Source:

Professional wins (5)

Thai LPGA Tour wins (5) 
2021 (2) Singha-BGC Narai 2nd Thai LPGA Championship, Singha-BGC 4th Thai LPGA Championship
2022 (1) SAT-NSDF 2nd Thai LPGA Championship
2023 (2) BGC Championship, NSDF Ladies Classic

 Vongtaveelap won the event as an amateur.

World ranking 
Position in Women's World Golf Rankings at the end of each calendar year.

^ As of 27 February 2023

Team appearances 
Southeast Asian Games (representing Thailand): 2021 (winners)
Queen Sirikit Cup (representing Thailand): 2018

References

External links

Natthakritta Vongtaveelap
LPGA Tour golfers
Natthakritta Vongtaveelap
2002 births
Living people
Natthakritta Vongtaveelap
Southeast Asian Games medalists in golf
Natthakritta Vongtaveelap
Competitors at the 2021 Southeast Asian Games